The Golden Number is an album of duets by the double bassist Charlie Haden recorded in 1976 and released on the Horizon label.

Reception

The editors of AllMusic awarded the album 4 stars, and Scott Yanow's review states: "In general, the music is quite intriguing and has its share of variety."

Author Donal McGraith commented: "This record is light as air, as joyful as any music I have heard and eminently approachable."

Pianist and composer Ethan Iverson called the album "essential," and singled out "Turnaround" for praise, writing: "Hawes is with Haden every second, reacting to those outer-space notes with faultless choices and never with too much left hand. There's even something Ornette-ish about a few of Hawes's phrases, and the last 'heraldic' stuff is pure Don Cherry."

Track listing
All compositions by Charlie Haden except as indicated
 "Out of Focus" - 7:27 
 "Shepp's Way" - 12:07 
 "Turnaround" (Ornette Coleman) - 7:52 
 "Golden Number" - 12:28 
Recorded at Kendun Recorders in Burbank, California, on June 7, 1976, (track 1), at Village Recorder in Los Angeles on August 21, 1976, (track 3) and at Generation Sound in New York City on December 19 (track 4) and December 20 (track 2), 1976.

Personnel
Charlie Haden — double bass
Don Cherry — pocket trumpet, flute (track 1)
Archie Shepp — tenor saxophone (track 2)
Hampton Hawes — piano (track 3)
Ornette Coleman — trumpet (track 4)

References 

Horizon Records albums
Charlie Haden albums
1977 albums